Marathakkara is a census town in Thrissur district in the Indian state of Kerala.

Demographics
 India census, Marathakkara had a population of 17,934. Males constitute 49% of the population and females 51%. Marathakkara has an average literacy rate of 81%, higher than the national average of 59.5%: male literacy is 83%, and female literacy is 79%. In Marathakkara, 12% of the population is under 6 years of age.

References

Cities and towns in Thrissur district